This is a list of years in Northern Ireland which was established on 3 May 1921. For only articles about years in Northern Ireland that have been written, see :Category:Years in Northern Ireland.

Twenty-first century 
2029 - 2028 - 2027 - 2026 - 2025 - 2024 - 2023 - 2022 - 2021 - 2020
2019 - 2018 - 2017 - 2016 - 2015 - 2014 - 2013 - 2012 - 2011 - 2010
2009 - 2008 - 2007 - 2006 - 2005 - 2004 - 2003 - 2002 - 2001

Twentieth century 
2000 - 1999 - 1998 - 1997 - 1996 - 1995 - 1994 - 1993 - 1992 - 1991
1990 - 1989 - 1988 - 1987 - 1986 - 1985 - 1984 - 1983 - 1982 - 1981
1980 - 1979 - 1978 - 1977 - 1976 - 1975 - 1974 - 1973 - 1972 - 1971
1970 - 1969 - 1968 - 1967 - 1966 - 1965 - 1964 - 1963 - 1962 - 1961
1960 - 1959 - 1958 - 1957 - 1956 - 1955 - 1954 - 1953 - 1952 - 1951
1950 - 1949 - 1948 - 1947 - 1946 - 1945 - 1944 - 1943 - 1942 - 1941
1940 - 1939 - 1938 - 1937 - 1936 - 1935 - 1934 - 1933 - 1932 - 1931
1930 - 1929 - 1928 - 1927 - 1926 - 1925 - 1924 - 1923 - 1922 - 1921

See also
List of years in the United Kingdom
List of years in England
List of years in Scotland
List of years in Wales

Years